PA36 may refer to:

 Pennsylvania's 36th congressional district, a congressional district in Pennsylvania
 Pennsylvania Route 36, a state route in Pennsylvania
 Piper PA-36 Pawnee Brave, an agricultural aircraft made by Piper Aircraft
 Pitcairn PA-36, an autogyro manufactured by the Pitcairn Aircraft Company